Nyasa Big Bullets is a Malawian professional association football club based in Blantyre, currently playing in the TNM Super League, the top division of Malawian football. The club was formerly known as Bata Bullets, Total Big Bullets and Bakili Bullets. Bullets are regarded as the number one football club in Malawi in terms of supporters, league title winning and financial background.

History
The club was formed in 1967 by a group of players who split from Mighty Wanderers. The original name was Nyasaland Bullets, but the club managed to source good sponsorship from Bata Shoe Company and was renamed as Bata Bullets.

1970 season was a great success as Bullets achieved a treble after winning the Blantyre and Districts Football League (BDFL), the Chibuku Cup and Castle Cup.

In 2003, then Malawi President Bakili Muluzi adopted the team and renamed it Bakili Bullets. It was during this period that the team enjoyed one of its glamorous periods, reaching the lucrative group stages of CAF Champions League 2004.

It was also during the same period that the club had a training camp in the United Kingdom in readiness for the CAF Champions League. Currently the team is sponsored by Nyasa Manufacturing Company (NMC).
Its nickname ever since is Maulle (native language for bullets).

On 8 October 2018, Rodgers Yasin was sacked as Nyasa Big Bullets head coach along with assistant Elijah Kananji.

Bullets are currently coached by former Zimbabwe national team manager Callisto Pasuwa, with former captain and Malawi national team defender Peter Mponda as his assistant.

Stadium

Kamuzu Stadium is a stadium located in Blantyre, with a capacity of 50,000 seats. It is located next to the Malawi National Council of Sports Offices.

The Blantyre derby

The Blantyre derby between Big Bullets and Mighty Wanderers is a fiercely contested match and in contrast to most of the other games played in the Malawi TNM Super League, matches between the two rivals always attract a large fanbase.

Honours

Domestic

Super League of Malawi:
 Winners (16): 1986, 1991, 1992, 1999, 2000, 2001, 2002, 2003, 2004, 2005, 2014, 2015, 2018, 2019, 2020–21, 2022
 Runners-up (4): 2008, 2012–13, 2016, 2017

Castle Cup (Malawi)
 Winners (4): 1969, 1970, 1973, 1975

Kamuzu Cup
 Winners (7): 1974, 1975, 1979, 1980, 1981, 1983, 1986

555 Challenge Cup: 
 Winners (1): 1990

Embassy Trophy:
 Winners (1): 2003

Chombe Tea:
 Winners (2): 1998, 1999

Carlsberg Cup: 
 Winners (3): 2002, 2014, 2017

Tutulane Charity Cup:
 Winners (1): 2007
Airtel Top 8 Cup
Winners (1) : 2021
Carlsberg Charity Cup:
 Winners (1): 2012

Presidential Cup:
 Winners (2): 2012, 2016

Chifundo Charity Shield:
 Winners (3): 2016, 2017, 2018, 2019, 2022

Continent
Kagame Interclub Cup
 Runners-up (1): 2021

Performance in CAF competitions
CAF Champions League: 7 appearances
2000 – Preliminary Round
2004 – Group Stage
2015 – First Round
2018–19 – Preliminary Round
2019–20 – Preliminary Round
2020–21 – Withdrew
2021–22 – First Round

African Cup of Champions Clubs: 3 appearances
1975: Second Round
1979: Withdrew in First Round
1993: Withdrew in Preliminary Round

CAF Cup Winners' Cup: 5 appearances
1976 – First Round
1977 – Second Round
1997 – First Round
1998 – Preliminary Round
1999 – First Round

Current squad 2020–21
As of June 2020

Club officials/technical team
  Chief Executive Officer:  Suzgo Nyirenda
  Board President:  Konrad Buckle
  Board Members:  1. Stone Mwamadi, 2. Fleetwood Haiya, 3. Malinda Chinyama, 4.Sadick Malinga, 5. Dimitri Kalaitzis, 6.Democrotos Kalaitzis, 7 Rev. Moyenda Kanjerwa, 8. Chifundo Makande, 9.Albert Chigoga, 10. Noel Lipipa, 11. Konrad Buckle, 12. Escort Chinula 
  Head Coach:  Kalisto Pasuwa
  Assistant coach:  Peter Mponda (1st),  Heston Munthali (2nd)
  Team Manager: James Chilapondwa
  Goalkeeper Trainer:  Swadick Sanudi
  Team Doctor: Felix Mwalule
  Kitmaster: Malumbo Chikoko
  Media Manager: Kimpho Loka

References

External links
 Website
 Facebook
 Twitter
 Instagram

Football clubs in Malawi
Association football clubs established in 1967
1967 establishments in Malawi